The Flying Horse of Gansu, also known as the Bronze Running Horse (銅奔馬) or the Galloping Horse Treading on a Flying Swallow (馬踏飛燕), is a Chinese bronze sculpture from circa the 2nd century CE. Discovered in 1969 near the city of Wuwei, in the province of Gansu, it is now in the Gansu Provincial Museum. "Perfectly balanced," says one authority, "on the one hoof which rests without pressure on a flying swallow, it is a remarkable example of three-dimensional form and of animal portraiture with the head vividly expressing mettlesome vigor."

Description
The statue is made from bronze. It is 34.5 cm in height, 45 cm in length, and 13.1 cm in width.

Discovery and world fame

The Flying Horse of Gansu was discovered in 1969. It was unearthed from a Han tomb at Leitai in Wuwei. The tomb belonged to General Zhang of Zhangye.
 
The discovery was made by a team of locals who had been told to dig air-raid shelters in the case of an imminent war with the Soviet Union. During the excavations, they found a chamber under a monastery which held a group of over 200 bronze figurines of men, horses, and chariots, which they put in plastic bags and took home.

They later realized the importance of their find and reported it to provincial authorities. Professional archaeologists then took up the excavations. They discovered a three-chambered tomb which had apparently been entered by looters soon after the original burial some 2,000 years earlier. The archaeologists determined that the opulent tomb was that of a Han dynasty army general who had been given the important task of maintaining imperial frontier defenses. They took the bronzes to the museum in Lanzhou.

In Lanzhou, the group of bronzes was observed by Guo Moruo, China's elder statesman of archaeology and history, who was conducting Cambodian Prince Sihanouk on a tour of China. Guo was struck by the beauty of the horse and selected it for national and international exhibition.

The horse in the bronze is a breed brought back from Fergana by a punitive expedition sent by Emperor Han Wudi in 104 BCE. These "celestial horses" were highly prized as marks of status.

Although scholars pointed out that the bird was not in fact a swallow, the piece was exhibited in many countries in the 1970s as "Galloping Horse Treading on a Flying Swallow."

In 2002, the State Administration of Cultural Heritage of China included the Gansu Flying Horse  in the inaugural list of 64 grade-one cultural relics that are forbidden to be taken out of mainland China for exhibition.

A copy of the sculpture was donated to the city of Lexington, Kentucky, USA on June 15th, 2000 by the City of Xi'an, China and Hao Bao Zhu, President, Five Rings International.

References

Citations

Sources

External links 

 Flying Horse of Gansu
 Gansu Provincial Museum

Horses in art
Chinese sculpture
Han dynasty
Bronze sculptures in China
Animal sculptures in China
1969 archaeological discoveries
Winged horses
Horses in China